Denilson Hernandes Santos Sineiro, usually known as Denilson (born 4 July 1987 in São Luís, Maranhão) is a Brazilian footballer who plays as a lateral. He currently plays for Moto Club.

Career
Born in São Luís, Maranhão, Denilson began playing football in the Bahia youth system. He would only appear in six competitive matches for Bahia before leaving in 2006. He played senior football with Maranhão, Moto Club, Sampaio Corrêa, Mixto, Coruripe and CSA. The right-back played for Sampaio Corrêa in Campeonato Brasileiro Série C during 2013, after winning Série D with the club in 2012. Denilson joined Mixto at the beginning of 2014.

Denilson's brother, Daylson, is also a footballer who plays right back. They both played for Maranhão during 2016.

Clubs

See also
Football in Brazil
List of football clubs in Brazil

References

External links
Profile at Soccerway.com

1987 births
Living people
Brazilian footballers
Association football defenders
Sociedade Esportiva Palmeiras players
Maranhão Atlético Clube players
Sampaio Corrêa Futebol Clube players
Mixto Esporte Clube players
Moto Club de São Luís players
Associação Atlética Coruripe players
Centro Sportivo Alagoano players
People from São Luís, Maranhão
Sportspeople from Maranhão